Moshe Rynecki (Mosheh Rynetski; 1881–1943) was a  Polish-Jewish artist. He was born in Międzyrzec Podlaski, Poland to a religious family. He was one of five surviving children of the eighteen born to his parents. Thirteen died of assorted childhood illnesses.

Life
Rynecki began drawing at an early age. According to family lore, he used to use chalk, or sometimes paint when he had some, to draw figures on the floor and walls of his home. According to a memoir written by his son, George, "Not once was he actually beaten for breaking the commandment, 'Thou shalt not create images.'" He once explained his drive to paint to his son. He told him, "God gave me talent and I truly don't believe in breaking that natural trend. I simply have to do it. If He wouldn't want me to paint, I wouldn't have that tremendous urge and desire to immortalize on paper or canvas what I see. I simply am a writer of sorts, instead of words, I leave my messages in pictures. I don't feel to trespass the Bible's saying about images."

Rynecki received little formal art education. Although he probably would have preferred to go straight to art school, he first had to complete his Jewish education at a yeshiva. He did this, and then went on to a Russian middle school, which was a prerequisite to acceptance at the Warsaw School of Fine Arts, which he attended for a brief period during the 1906-1907 school year.

At age 17, Rynecki met Perla Mittelsbach, the daughter of a Warsaw family of some means. They married, and, while Moshe continued his studies at the Warsaw Academy, Perla was left to oversee the household and to run a small store (that store was located on Krucza Street). The store, which sold writing materials, books, and paintings supplies for artists, provided the family with an income. At about the same time, the store opened, Perla gave birth to a daughter. About a year and a half later, she gave birth to a son, George.

After completing his formal education, Rynecki went on to paint that which he knew best; the community in which he lived. In paintings such as "The Chess Players" and "Woman Embroidering," he captured people doing everyday activities and in paintings such as "Simhat Torah," "Synagogue Interior," and "In the Study," his works capture places, events, and issues central to the Jewish community. While some of his works were shown in local galleries were met with good reviews, his son George claims, "he was not successful in selling any of his works."

Early in the Second World War Rynecki was forced into the Warsaw Ghetto. Although he had little access to painting materials in the Ghetto, he did continue to paint. Only three paintings from this period of his life survived the Holocaust: "In the Shelter," "Forced Labor," and "Refugees."

In early 1943, Moshe was deported to Majdanek concentration camp, where he was murdered.

Sources
Elizabeth Rynecki, Chasing Portraits: A Great-Granddaughter's Quest for Her Lost Art Legacy, Penguin Random House, 2016.
George J. Rynecki, Surviving Hitler in Poland: One Jew's Story, Trafford Publishing, 2006.
Moshe Rynecki, Elizabeth Rynecki, Jewish Life in Poland: The Art of Moshe Rynecki (1881-1943), Trafford Publishing, 2005.
Moshe Rynecki, 1881-1943, Judah L. Magnes Museum, 1981.

References

External links
Moshe Rynecki: Portrait of a Life in Art  is an online gallery about the life and work of Moshe Rynecki. The site includes an art gallery, collection and exhibition information, an annotated bibliography, educational resources, and a blog.
 Rynecki bio source

Chasing Portraits  documentary film and book 
 Rynecki's works in Central Jewish Library

1881 births
1943 deaths
Polish Jews who died in the Holocaust
Polish painters of Jewish descent
People who died in Majdanek concentration camp
Polish civilians killed in World War II
Warsaw Ghetto inmates
People from Międzyrzec Podlaski